This list of reptiles of Morocco is an incomplete collection of reptiles found in Morocco.

 Endemic species
 Introduced species

Crocodilians

Family Crocodylidae

Lizards

Family Trogonophidae

Family Agamidae

Family Anguidae

Family Chamaeleonidae

Family Gekkonidae

Family Lacertidae

Family Scincidae

Family Varanidae

Snakes

Family Boidae

Family Colubridae

Family Elapidae

Family Leptotyphlopidae

Family Viperidae

Turtles

Family Cheloniidae

Family Dermochelyidae

Family Emydidae

Family Testudinidae

Worm lizards

Family Amphisbaenidae

Family Trogonophidae

References

External links 
 Amphibians and Reptiles from Morocco

 
Morocco
Reptiles
Morocco